Relja Popović (born on 2 August 1989) is a Serbian actor and rapper who rose to prominence as a member of Elitni Odredi.

As an actor, he won the Heart of Sarajevo award for his role in the 2009 film Ordinary People.

Early life
Popović was born on August 2, 1989 in Belgrade, SFR Yugoslavia. His mother, Zoja Begolli, was a ballet dancer at the National Theatre in Belgrade and lecturer at the Academy of Arts, and his father, Srđan Popović, worked as a sports journalist at the daily newspaper Večernje novosti. Popović lost his father in 1991. He grew up in the Paviljoni neighborhood of New Belgrade. Relja stated that he found passion for hip-hop as a child, being exposed by his older brother Miša to artists such as Eminem, Jay-Z and Juice. Before graduating from high school Popović was shot in stomach while defending his girl friend in a pub, and had his kidney and spleen removed.

Career

Music
Popović began his professional music career in 2005 alongside his childhood friend Vladimir Matović, as a part of Elitni Odredi. Together they released one studio album, titled Oko sveta (2010), and several standalone singles. Elitni Odredi eventually announced their disbandment at the beginning of 2015. Following the duo's hiatus, Popović pursued a solo career with the release of the single "Beograd još živi" in April the same year. 

In July 2019, he held his first solo concert in Belgrade during the Ulaz music festival. At the beginning of 2020, Popović established a record label imprint, called Made In Blkn Records, in distribution deal with IDJTunes. The company was in 2021 also expanded to a clothing brand. The following year, Relja alongside Teodora Džehverović and Darko Dimitrov was announced as a judge and coach on the singing competition series IDJShow. In June, his contestant Amna Alajbegović was declared the season one winner.

Acting
Popović made his on screen debut in the short film Dremano oko (2003), directed by Vladimir Perišić. Subsequently, for his performance in Perišić's Ordinary People (2009) Relja became the youngest recipient of the Heart of Sarajevo award at the Sarajevo Film Festival. In the 2011 movie The Parade, Popović starred as a skinhead and the son of Nikola Kojo's character. 

In December 2021, he was introduced to the second season of the crime drama series Besa.

Personal life
Popović graduated from the Faculty of Media and Communications at the Singidunum University and also studied acting at the Academy of Arts in Belgrade.

In 2014, he started dating singer Nikolija Jovanović after Elitni Odredi had collaborated with her on their single "Alkohola litar". The couple has two daughters, born on 26 September 2016 and 17 July 2021.

Filmography

Film

Television

Discography

Awards and nominations
Acting

Music

External links

References

1989 births
Living people
Singers from Belgrade
21st-century Serbian male singers
Serbian rappers
Serbian folk-pop singers
21st-century Serbian male actors